was a top-ranking official in Japan's Tokugawa shogunate during its early decades, and one of the chief advisors to the second Tokugawa shōgun, Hidetada.

The adopted son of Doi Toshimasa, Toshikatsu is generally believed to be the biological son of Mizuno Nobumoto, though there are some who claim he was an illegitimate son of shōgun Tokugawa Ieyasu. He served the shogunate as advisor to shōgun Tokugawa Hidetada for many years, and played an important role in communicating and overseeing the enforcement of shogunal policy across the country; Doi also helped effect trade and diplomatic relations between Japan and the Thai Kingdom of Ayutthaya. He lost much of his influence and power upon Hidetada's death in 1632. Six years later, Doi became one of the first to be appointed to the newly created post of Tairō (Great Elder), and was made daimyō (feudal lord) of Koga Domain in Shimōsa Province, with a revenue of 160,000 koku.

References

References
Frederic, Louis (2002). Japan Encyclopedia. Cambridge, Massachusetts: Harvard University Press.
Khamchoo, Chaiwat and E. Bruce Reynolds (eds.) (1988). Thai–Japanese Relations in Historical Perspective. Bangkok: Innomedia Co, Ltd Press.
Sansom, George (1963). A History of Japan: 1615–1867. Stanford, California: Stanford University Press.

See also
Doi clan

|-

|-

Daimyo
Tairō
Rōjū
1573 births
1644 deaths